Off to the Races is the fifth studio album by American power pop band Jukebox the Ghost. The album was self-released on March 30, 2018. It was mostly recorded at Studio G in Brooklyn and engineered, produced and mixed by Chris Cubeta and Gary Atturio, with two exceptions: “Everybody’s Lonely” was produced by CJ Baran and Peter Thomas and “Fred Astaire” was produced by Chris Wallace. 

The album contained the single "Everybody's Lonely", which was the band's first single to chart, reaching number 22 in the Billboard Alternative Songs chart.

Track listing

Charts

References 

2018 albums
Jukebox the Ghost albums